Mercurius Hungaricus, later Mercurius Veridicus ex Hungaria was the first periodical newspaper in the Kingdom of Hungary, published between 1705 and 1710 (only seven issues). It was a semiofficial news release for the Rákóczi's War of Independence, the articles were written in mostly Latin language.

References

External links
 Mercurius Veridicus ex Hungaria 1705-1710, OSZK, Elektronikus Periodika Archívum

1705 establishments in the Habsburg monarchy
1710 disestablishments in Europe
Publications established in 1705
Publications disestablished in 1710
Defunct newspapers published in Hungary
Latin-language newspapers